Alfred Franke (20 September 1918 – 9 September 1942) was a German Luftwaffe ace and recipient of the Knight's Cross of the Iron Cross during World War II.  The Knight's Cross of the Iron Cross was awarded to recognise extreme battlefield bravery or successful military leadership.  On 9 September 1942, Alfred Franke was killed north of Stalingrad after dog-fighting with a Soviet Il-2 Shturmovik flown by Kapitan Pavel S. Vinogradov. He was posthumously awarded the Knight's Cross on 29 October 1942 and was also promoted to Lieutenant.  During his career he was credited with 60 aerial victories. 4 on the Western Front and 56 on the Eastern Front.

Awards
 Front Flying Clasp of the Luftwaffe
 Iron Cross (1939) 2nd Class & 1st Class
 Ehrenpokal der Luftwaffe on 13 September 1942 as Oberfeldwebel and pilot
 German Cross in Gold on 25 September 1942 as Oberfeldwebel in the I./Jagdgeschwader 53
 Knight's Cross of the Iron Cross on 29 October 1942 as Oberfeldwebel and pilot in the 2./Jagdgeschwader 53

References

Citations

Bibliography

 
 
 
 
 
 
 

1918 births
1942 deaths
Military personnel from Jena
German World War II flying aces
Recipients of the Gold German Cross
Recipients of the Knight's Cross of the Iron Cross
Luftwaffe personnel killed in World War II
Aviators killed by being shot down